Millennium High School in Piedmont, California, United States is the Piedmont Unified School District's alternative high school. Millennium strives to help each student find the path that matches his or her unique interests, needs, and learning styles.

Academics
Classes are small, with about 10 to 15 students per class, so students can work at their own pace, and there is more personal attention than in a normal public high school. Students are encouraged to take advantage of their strengths. Credit is earned according to how much students accomplish in class, and they may also earn credits for outside activities, including sports or individual physical exercise programs, music and dramatic arts lessons and activities, employment, community college classes, and community service.

The Piedmont Educational Foundation supports a number of these programs through its grants program.

The class schedule is flexible, with different students' school hours varying. Millennium students can also take courses at Piedmont High.

The curriculum is aligned with Content Standards for California Public Schools, and courses satisfy University of California "a-g" admission requirements.

In 2005, the school received a 709 API score, matching the state average exactly. It was the first year the school received a score. The average API score of the district that year was 920, an 18-point increase from the year before.

Attendance
A significant difference between Millennium and Piedmont High School is that to attend PHS, a student must either prove residency in the city of Piedmont or have parents who work for the school district. Millennium is open to local students outside Piedmont, through interdistrict transfer.

Basketball stars Courtney and Ashley Paris are among notable alumni from Millennium.

George Lucas, the director of the Star Wars films, granted the school the right to use the image of the Millennium Falcon on a school sweatshirt, as well as to represent the school as its mascot, effectively creating the Millennium (High School) Falcon. Zak Filler '10 wrote to Mr. Lucas to request permission to continue with the move. "I am a big Star Wars fan," Filler wrote, "a bit on the nerdy side." According to Dr. Deah Schwartz, Filler's mother and one of the parents involved in organizing the project, as of February 5, 2009 about 50 shirts in all had been sold, to a student body that totals only in the 70s.

See also
Piedmont High School
Piedmont Unified School District

References

External links
Millennium High School Home Page
Berkeley Parents Network on the topic of Millennium High School

Piedmont, California
High schools in Alameda County, California
Public high schools in California